An enhanced geothermal system (EGS) generates geothermal electricity without the need for natural convective hydrothermal resources. Until recently, geothermal power systems have exploited only resources where naturally occurring heat, water, and rock permeability are sufficient to allow energy extraction. However, by far the most geothermal energy within reach of conventional techniques is in dry and impermeable rock. EGS technologies enhance and/or create geothermal resources, including in this hot dry rock (HDR) through a variety of stimulation methods, including 'hydraulic stimulation'.

Overview
When natural cracks and pores do not allow economic flow rates, the permeability can be enhanced by pumping high-pressure cold water down an injection well into the rock. The injection increases the fluid pressure in the naturally fractured rock, triggering shear events that enhance the system's permeability. As long as the injection pressure is maintained, a high matrix permeability is not required, nor are hydraulic fracturing proppants required to maintain the fractures in an open state.  This process is termed hydro-shearing, perhaps to differentiate it from hydraulic tensile fracturing, used in the oil and gas industry, which can create new fractures through the rock in addition to expanding the existing fractures.

Water travels through fractures in the rock, capturing the rock's heat until forced out of a second borehole as very hot water. The water's heat is converted into electricity using either a steam turbine or a binary power plant system. All of the water, now cooled, is injected back into the ground to heat up again.

EGS technologies can function as baseload resources that produce power 24 hours a day. Unlike hydrothermal, EGS may be feasible anywhere in the world, depending on the economic limits of drill depth. Good locations are over deep granite covered by a  layer of insulating sediments that slow heat loss. Advanced drilling techniques may be able to drill into hard crystalline rock at depths of up to or exceeding 15 km, which would give access to higher-temperature rock (400°C and above) around the world. An EGS plant is expected to have an economical lifetime of 20–30 years using current technology.

EGS systems are currently being developed and tested in Australia, France, Germany, Japan, Switzerland, and the United States. The largest EGS project in the world is a 25-megawatt demonstration plant currently being developed in Cooper Basin, Australia.  Cooper Basin has the potential to generate 5,000–10,000 MW.

Research and development

EGS technologies use a variety of methods to create additional flow paths inside reservoir rocks. Past EGS projects around the world have used combinations of hydraulic, chemical, thermal, and explosive stimulation methods. EGS projects also include those at the edges of current hydrothermal geothermal sites where drilled wells intersected hot, yet impermeable, reservoir rocks and stimulation methods were used to enhance that permeability. The table below shows both large and small EGS projects around the world.

Australia

The Australian government has provided research funding for the development of Hot Dry Rock technology.

European Union

The EU's EGS R&D project at Soultz-sous-Forêts, France, has recently connected its 1.5 MW demonstration plant to the grid. The Soultz project has explored the connection of multiple stimulated zones and the performance of triplet well configurations (1 injector/2 producers).

Induced seismicity in Basel led to the cancellation of the EGS project there.

The Portuguese government awarded, in December 2008, an exclusive license to Geovita Ltd to prospect and explore geothermal energy in one of the best areas in continental Portugal. An area of about 500 square kilometers is being studied by Geovita together with the Earth Sciences department of the University of Coimbra's Science and Technology faculty, and the installation of an Enhanced Geothermal System (EGS) is foreseen.

South Korea
The Pohang EGS project was started in December 2010, with the goal of producing 1 MW.

Deep drilling experience gained under the drilling of the first of two wells from the project, was shared at a conference in 2015.

The 2017 Pohang earthquake may have been linked to the activity of the Pohang EGS project. All research activities on the site was stopped in 2018.

United Kingdom 

Cornwall is set to host a 3MW demonstration project, based at the Eden Project, that could pave the way for a series of 50-MW commercial-scale geothermal power stations in suitable areas across the country.

A commercial-scale project near Redruth is also planned. The plant, which has been granted planning permission, would generate 10 MW of electricity and 55 MW of thermal energy and is scheduled to become operational in 2013–2014.

United States

Early days — Fenton Hill

The first EGS effort — then termed Hot Dry Rock — took place at Fenton Hill, New Mexico with a project run by the federal Los Alamos Laboratory.  It was the first attempt to make a deep, full-scale EGS reservoir.

The EGS reservoir at Fenton Hill was first completed in 1977 at a depth of about 2.6 km, with rock temperatures of 185°C. In 1979 the reservoir was enlarged with additional hydraulic stimulation and was operated for about 1 year. The results demonstrated that heat could be extracted at reasonable rates from a hydraulically stimulated region of low-permeability hot crystalline rock. In 1986, a second reservoir was prepared for initial hydraulic circulation and heat extraction testing. In a 30-day flow test with a constant reinjection temperature of 20°C, the production temperature steadily increased to about 190°C, corresponding to a thermal power level of about 10MW. Due to budget cuts, further study at Fenton Hill was discontinued.

Working at the edges—using EGS technology to improve hydrothermal resources 
EGS funding languished for the next few years, and by the next decade, US efforts focused on the less ambitious goal of improving the productivity of existing hydrothermal resources. 

In 2009, The US Department of Energy (USDOE) issued two Funding Opportunity Announcements (FOAs) related to enhanced geothermal systems. Together, the two FOAs offered up to $84 million over six years.

The DOE followed up with another FOA in 2009, of stimulus funding from the American Reinvestment and Recovery Act for $350 million, including $80 million aimed specifically at EGS projects,

FORGE 
In February 2014, the Department of Energy (DOE) announced the intent to establish "a dedicated subsurface laboratory called the Frontier Observatory for Research in Geothermal Energy (FORGE)" in order to investigate and develop enhanced geothermal technology. In August 2016, it was announced that the proposed sites had been narrowed to two (in Utah and Nevada), expected to be reduced to one the following year. In June 2018 the Department of Energy announced that a location outside of Milford, Utah had been selected to host the FORGE laboratory. Over a five-year period, the University of Utah will receive up to $140 million for cutting edge geothermal research and development.

The FORGE site is located 350 km south of Salt Lake City, Utah along the Colorado Plateau and Basin and Range Province transitional zone. The underlying geology is primarily composed of intrusive Oligocene through Miocene batholith rock emplaced into Precambrian metamorphic (Gneiss) and Paleozoic sedimentary rocks. This site is west of the Mineral Mountains and about two km east of the north–south trending Opal Mond Fault (OMF), perpendicular to the east–west trending Negro Mag Fault (NMF). The FORGE is dominated by a fault-fracture mesh system with Opal Mound Fault one of the most active features of the FORGE site. The fault structures vary from steeply dipping faults west of the Mineral Mountains to more gently steeping faults to the east of the FORGE site. The Enhanced Geothermal System (EGS) reservoir of the FORGE site is located approximately between 1525 and 2896 meters (~5,000-10,000 ft) depth and lies between a temperature range of 175-225 degrees Celsius. The EGS reservoir is in rock aged from 8 Ma to 25.4 Ma. Located east of the FORGE site is Roosevelt Hot Springs, a hydrothermal area with temperatures ranging from about 100 degrees Celsius at the surface to over 250 degrees Celsius at a depth of roughly 4000 meters (13,123.4 ft). The temperatures of Roosevelt Hot Springs (RHS) indicate the presence of cooling magma in the shallow crust.

More than 80 shallow gradient wells (less than 500 m depth) and 20 deeps wells (greater than 500 m depth) have been drilled at and near the FORGE site since the 1970s. Analyses from the shallow well data shows that the encountered granitic rocks are dry, or not producing fluids, but are elevated in temperature. A lack of fluid production by the underlying granitic rocks indicates these rocks are impermeable and that the FORGE site is a classic example of a hot dry rock energy producing system. The thermal grounds of the FORGE site covers most of the northern Milford valley. The highest temperature wells (greater than 80 degrees Celsius) are located east of the OMF above the RHS hydrothermal system. Near-surface profiles (less than 80 m depth) of temperature gradient are similar in central, southern and western sectors of the FORGE site at roughly 70 degrees Celsius per km and do not exceed 270 drees Celsius, even at higher temperature wells west of the FORGE site.

Cornell University — Ithaca, NY 
Developing EGS in conjunction with a district heating system is a part in Cornell University's Climate Action Plan for their Ithaca campus. The project began in 2018 with the preparatory phase to determine feasibility, gain funding and monitor baseline seismicity. The project received $7.2 million in funding from the USDOE. A test well will be drilled in spring of 2021, at a depth of 2.5 –5 km targeting rock with a temperature > 85 °C. The site is planned to supply 20% of the campus' annual heating load. Promising geological locations for reservoir have been proposed in the Trenton-Black River formation (2.2 km) or in basement crystalline rock (3.5 km).

EGS "earthshot"
In September 2022, the Geothermal Technologies Office within the Department of Energy's Office of Energy Efficiency and Renewable Energy announced an "Enhanced Geothermal Shot" as part of their Energy Earthshots campaign. The goal of the Earthshot is to reduce the cost of EGS by 90%, to $45/megawatt hour by 2035.

Other federal funding and support
The Infrastructure Investment and Jobs Act authorized $84 million to support EGS development through four demonstration projects. The Inflation Reduction Act extended the Production Tax Credit for renewable energy sources (including geothermal) until 2024 and included geothermal energy in the new Clean Electricity PTC which begins in 2024.

In December 2022, US Energy Secretary Jennifer Granholm described geothermal as one of her favorite topics.

Induced seismicity

Some induced seismicity is inevitable and expected in EGS, which involves pumping fluids at pressure to enhance or create permeability through the use of hydro-shearing and hydraulic fracturing techniques. Hydro-shear stimulation methods seek to expand and extend the connectivity of the rock's existing fractures to create a better fluid network for the transfer of heat from the rock to the fluid. Seismicity events at the Geysers geothermal field in California have been strongly correlated with injection data.

The case of induced seismicity in Basel merits special mention; it led the city (which is a partner) to suspend the project and conduct a seismic hazard evaluation, which resulted in the cancellation of the project in December 2009.

According to the Australian government, risks associated with "hydrofracturing induced seismicity are low compared to that of natural earthquakes, and can be reduced by careful management and monitoring" and "should not be regarded as an impediment to further development of the Hot Rock geothermal energy resource". However, the risks of induced seismicity vary from site to site and should be considered before large scale fluid injection is begun.

EGS potential in the United States

A 2006 report by MIT, and funded by the U.S. Department of Energy, conducted the most comprehensive analysis to date on the potential and technical status of EGS. The 18-member panel, chaired by Professor Jefferson Tester of MIT, reached several significant conclusions:
 Resource size: The report calculated the United States total EGS resources from 3–10 km of depth to be over 13,000 zettajoules, of which over 200 ZJ would be extractable, with the potential to increase this to over 2,000 ZJ with technology improvements — sufficient to provide all the world's current energy needs for several millennia. The report found that total geothermal resources, including hydrothermal and geo-pressured resources, to equal 14,000 ZJ — or roughly 140,000 times the total U.S. annual primary energy use in 2005.
 Development potential: With an R&D investment of $1 billion over 15 years, the report estimated that 100 GWe (gigawatts of electricity) or more could be installed by 2050 in the United States. The report further found that "recoverable" resources (accessible with today's technology) were between 1.2 and 12.2 TW for the conservative and moderate recovery scenarios respectively.
 Cost: The report found that EGS could be capable of producing electricity for as low as 3.9 cents/kWh. EGS costs were found to be sensitive to four main factors:
 Temperature of the resource
 Fluid flow through the system measured in liters/second
 Drilling costs
 Power conversion efficiency

Hot dry rock (HDR)

Hot dry rock (HDR) is an extremely abundant source of geothermal energy that is difficult to access. A vast store of thermal energy is contained within hot, dry crystalline basement rocks found almost everywhere deep beneath Earth's surface. A method for the extraction of useful amounts of geothermal energy from HDR originated at the Los Alamos National Laboratory in 1970, and Laboratory researchers were awarded a US patent covering it.

This technology has been tested extensively with multiple deep wells drilled in several field areas around world including the US, Japan, Australia, France, and the UK.  It continues to be the focus of sizable government-led research studies involving deep drilling and rock studies. Thermal energy has been recovered in reasonably sustainable tests over periods of years and in some cases electrical power generation was also achieved. Ongoing efforts are underway to further develop and test EGS technologies in hot dry rock systems. EGS in hot dry rock has not yet been commercialized, but one estimate suggests a possible price of $20-35 per MWh for nth-of-a-kind power plants.

Overview
Although often confused with the relatively limited hydrothermal resource already commercialized to a large extent, HDR geothermal energy is very different. Whereas hydrothermal energy production can exploit hot fluids already in place in Earth's crust, an HDR system (consisting of the pressurized HDR reservoir, the boreholes drilled from the surface, and the surface injection pumps and associated plumbing) recovers Earth's heat from hot but dry regions via the closed-loop circulation of pressurized fluid. This fluid, injected from the surface under high pressure, opens pre-existing joints in the basement rock, creating a man-made reservoir which can be as much as a cubic kilometer in size. The fluid injected into the reservoir absorbs thermal energy from the high-temperature rock surfaces and then conveys the heat to the surface for practical use.

History
The idea of deep hot dry rocks heat mining was described by Konstantin Tsiolkovsky (1898), Charles Parsons (1904), and Vladimir Obruchev (1920).

In 1963 in Paris, a geothermal heating system that used the heat of natural fractured rocks was built.

The Fenton Hill project was the first system for extracting HDR geothermal energy from an artificial formed reservoir; it was created in 1977.

Technology

Planning and control

As the reservoir is formed by the pressure-dilation of the joints, the elastic response of the surrounding rock mass results in a region of tightly compressed, sealed rock at the periphery—making the HDR reservoir totally confined and contained. Such a reservoir is therefore fully engineered, in that the physical characteristics (size, depth at which it is created) as well as the operating parameters (injection and production pressures, production temperature, etc.) can be pre-planned and closely controlled.  On the other hand the tight compression and confined nature of the reservoir severely limits that amount and the rate at which energy can be extracted.

Drilling and pressurization
As described by Brown, an HDR geothermal energy system is developed, first, by using conventional drilling to access a region of deep, hot basement rock. Once it has been determined the selected region contains no open faults or joints (by far the most common situation), an isolated section of the first borehole is pressurized at a level high enough to open several sets of previously sealed joints in the rock mass. By continuous pumping (hydraulic stimulation), a very large region of stimulated rock is created (the HDR reservoir) which consists of an interconnected array of joint flow paths within the rock mass. The opening of these flow paths causes movement along the pressure-activated joints, generating seismic signals (microearthquakes). Analysis of these signals yields information about the location and dimensions of the reservoir being developed.

Production wells

Typically, an HDR reservoir forms in the shape of an ellipsoid, with its longest axis orthogonal to the least principal Earth stress. This pressure-stimulated region is then accessed by two production wells, drilled to intersect the HDR reservoir near the elongated ends of the stimulated region. In most cases, the initial borehole becomes the injection well for the three-well, pressurized water-circulating system.

Operation

In operation, fluid is injected at pressures high enough to hold open the interconnected network of joints against the Earth stresses, and to effectively circulate fluid through the HDR reservoir at a high rate. During routine energy production, the injection pressure is maintained at just below the level that would cause further pressure-stimulation of the surrounding rock mass, in order to maximize energy production while limiting further reservoir growth. However, the limited reservoir size limits reservoir energy.  Meanwhile high pressure operation adds significant cost to piping and pumping systems.

Productivity

The volume of the newly created array of opened joints within the HDR reservoir is much less than 1% of the volume of the pressure-stimulated rock mass. As these joints continue to pressure and cooling -dilate, the overall flow impedance across the reservoir is reduced, leading to a high thermal productivity. If the cooling leads to cooling fractures in a way that exposes more rock then it is possible that these reservoirs may improve over time.  To date reservoir energy growth is only reported to come from new expensive high pressure well stimulation efforts.

Feasibility studies
The feasibility of mining heat from the deep Earth was proven in two separate HDR reservoir flow demonstrations—each involving about one year of circulation—conducted by the Los Alamos National Laboratory between 1978 and 1995. The two separate reservoirs created at Fenton Hill are still the only truly confined HDR geothermal energy reservoirs flow-tested anywhere in the world.

Fenton Hill tests

Phase I
The first HDR reservoir tested at Fenton Hill, the Phase I reservoir, was created in June 1977 and then flow-tested for 75 days, from January to April 1978, at a thermal power level of 4 MW.

The initial Phase I reservoir was enlarged in 1979 and further flow-tested for almost a year in 1980. Of greatest importance, this flow test confirmed that the enlarged reservoir was also confined, and exhibited a low water loss rate of 6 gpm. This reservoir consisted of the single near-vertical joint of the initial reservoir (which, as noted above, had been flow-tested for 75 days in early 1978) augmented by a set of newly pressure-stimulated near-vertical joints that were somewhat oblique to the strike of the original joint.

Phase II
A deeper and hotter HDR reservoir (Phase II) was created during a massive hydraulic fracturing (MHF) operation in late 1983. It was first flow-tested in the spring of 1985, by an initial closed-loop flow test (ICFT) that lasted a little over a month. Information garnered from the ICFT provided the basis for a subsequent long-term flow test (LTFT), carried out from 1992 to 1995.

The LTFT comprised several individual steady-state flow runs, interspersed with numerous additional experiments. In 1992–1993, two steady-state circulation periods were implemented, the first for 112 days and the second for 55 days. Over this time span, the reservoir pressure was maintained (even during shut-in periods) at a level of about 15 MPa.

Beginning in mid-1993, the reservoir was shut in for a period of nearly two years and the applied pressure was allowed to drop to essentially zero. In the spring of 1995, the system was re-pressurized and a third continuous circulation run of 66 days was conducted. Remarkably, the production parameters observed in the two earlier tests were rapidly re-established, and steady-state energy production resumed at the same level as before. Observations during both the shut-in and operational phases of all these flow-testing periods provided clear evidence that the rock at the boundary of this man-made reservoir had been compressed by the pressurization and resultant expansion of the reservoir region.

As a result of the LTFT, water loss was eliminated as a major concern in HDR operations. Over the period of the LTFT, water consumption fell to just 7% of the quantity of water injected; and data indicated it would have continued to decline under steady-state circulation conditions. Dissolved solids and gases in the produced fluid rapidly reached equilibrium values at low concentrations (about one-tenth the salinity of sea water), and the fluid remained geochemically benign throughout the test period. Routine operation of the automated surface plant showed that HDR energy systems could be run using the same economical staffing schedules that a number of unmanned commercial hydrothermal plants already employ.

Test results
An advantage of an HDR reservoir is that its confined nature makes it highly suitable for load-following operations, whereby the rate of energy production is varied to meet the varying demand for electric power—a process that can greatly increase the economic competitiveness of the technology.

Soultz tests
In 1986 the HDR system project of France and Germany in Soultz-sous-Forêts was started. In 1991 wells were drilled to 2.2 km depth and were stimulated. However, the attempt to create a reservoir was unsuccessful as high water losses was observed.

In 1995 wells were deepened to 3.9 km and stimulated. A reservoir was created successfully in 1997 and a four-month circulation test with  flow rate without water loss was attained.

In 2003 wells were deepened to 5.1 km. Stimulations were done to create a third reservoir, during circulation tests in 2005-2008 water was produced at a temperature of about 160 °C with low water loss. Construction of a power plant was begun.
The power plant started to produce electricity in 2016, it was installed with a gross capacity of 1.7 MWe.

Unconfirmed systems
There have been numerous reports of the testing of unconfined geothermal systems pressure-stimulated in crystalline basement rock: for instance at the Rosemanowes quarry in Cornwall, England; at the Hijiori and Ogachi calderas in Japan; and in the Cooper Basin, Australia. However, all these “engineered” geothermal systems, while developed under programs directed toward the investigation of HDR technologies, have proven to be open—as evidenced by the high water losses observed during pressurized circulation.  In essence, they are all EGS or hydrothermal systems, not true HDR reservoirs.

Related terminology

Enhanced geothermal systems

The EGS concept was first described by Los Alamos researchers in 1990, at a geothermal symposium sponsored by the United States Department of Energy (DOE)—many years before the DOE coined the term EGS in an attempt to emphasize the geothermal aspect of heat mining rather than the unique characteristics of HDR.

HWR versus HDR
Hot Wet Rock (HWR) hydrothermal technology makes use of hot fluids found naturally in basement rock; but such HWR conditions are rare. By far the bulk of the world's geothermal resource base (over 98%) is in the form of basement rock that is hot but dry—with no naturally available water. This means that HDR technology is applicable almost everywhere on Earth (hence the claim that HDR geothermal energy is ubiquitous). On the other hand an uneconomic resource is actually just energy storage and not useful.

Typically, the temperature in those vast regions of the accessible crystalline basement rock increases with depth. This geothermal gradient, which is the principal HDR resource variable, ranges from less than 20 °C/km to over 60 °C/km, depending upon location. The concomitant HDR economic variable is the cost of drilling to depths at which rock temperatures are sufficiently high to permit the development of a suitable reservoir. The advent of new technologies for drilling hard crystalline basement rocks, such as new PDC (polycrystalline diamond compact) drill bits, drilling turbines or fluid-driven percussive technologies (such as Mudhammer ) may significantly improve HDR economics in the near future.

Further reading
A definitive book on HDR development, including a full account of the experiments at Fenton Hill, was published by Springer-Verlag in April 2012.

Glossary
 DOE, Department of Energy (United States)
 EGS, Enhanced geothermal system
 HDR, Hot dry rock
 HWR, Hot wet rock
 ICFT, Initial closed-loop flow test
 LTFT, Long-term flow test
 MHF, Massive hydraulic fracturing
 PDC, Polycrystalline diamond compact (drill bit)

See also

 Caprock
 Drilling
 Drilling rig
 Geothermal energy exploration in Central Australia
 Geothermal energy in the United States
 Geothermal exploration
 Iceland Deep Drilling Project
 Laser drilling
 Rosemanowes Quarry

References

External links 
 EERE:
 Geothermal basics
 Hot Dry Rock (HDR)
 How an Enhanced Geothermal System Works
 NREL: Interactive Data Map - Geothermal Prospector Tool (see Geothermal - Deep Enhanced Geothermal Potential)
 Geothermal investment rocks says DLA Phillips Fox
 MEGSorg
 EGS

Power station technology
Geothermal energy
Machining